Rhodamnia argentea is a rainforest tree of eastern Australia. Commonly known as malletwood, white myrtle, silver leaf, silver malletwood and white turpentine. The natural habitat is a variety of different rain forests, at sea level or in the adjacent ranges. Growing on sand, alluvium and volcanic based soils. From the Hastings River, New South Wales to Bowen, Queensland.

Description 
A mid-sized tree up to 30 metre in height and a stem diameter of 85 centimetre. The trunk can be straight and tall, somewhat fluted or buttressed at the base. Papery brown or grey bark, with vertical cracks and fissures on larger trees. Small branches are brown, though at the end they become white or silvery, as do new shoots.

Leaves can be ovate, lanceolate, elliptic or oval in shape. 4 to 13 cm long, 2.5 to 6 cm wide. Oil dots not or seldom visible. Leaves three veined in appearance. The leaf base is triangular in shape. Leaves silvery white underneath.

Flowers and fruit 
White flowers form in cymes appearing from leaf axils in November and December. The cyme is on a stalk up to 13 mm long, and usually produces three small flowers. The fruit is round black berry, 10 mm in diameter. Inside are one or more yellow seeds. Fruit matures from March to June.

The fruit is eaten by various birds, including the green catbird, Lewin's honeyeater and regent bowerbird. Removing the seed from the fleshy aril is advised to assist germination. Germination from seed is slow, and cuttings have proven unreliable.

References

Myrtales of Australia
Trees of Australia
Flora of New South Wales
Flora of Queensland
argentea